Brda is a settlement in the Municipality of Radovljica in the Upper Carniola region of Slovenia.

Name
Brda was attested in written sources as Egk in 1498.

References

External links 
Brda at Geopedia

Populated places in the Municipality of Radovljica